The Gădălin is a right tributary of the river Someșul Mic in Romania. It discharges into the Someșul Mic in Bonțida.

References

Rivers of Romania
Rivers of Cluj County